Vastan Mines are lignite and limestone mines in Gujarat state of India. They are under administration of Gujarat Industries power company limited (GIPCL) 
Scientists have discovered bat fossils there

References

Mines in India